Anatole Abragam (15 December 1914 – 8 June 2011) was a French physicist who wrote The Principles of Nuclear Magnetism and made significant contributions to the field of nuclear magnetic resonance. Originally from Griva, Courland Governorate, Russian Empire, Abragam and his family emigrated to France in 1925.

Education
After being educated at the University of Paris, (1933–1936), he served in the Second World War.  After the war, he resumed his studies at the École Supérieure d'Électricité and subsequently obtained his Ph.D. from the University of Oxford in 1950 under the supervision of Maurice Pryce.

Career and research
In 1976, he was made an Honorary Fellow of Merton College, Oxford, Magdalen College, Oxford, and Jesus College, Oxford. From 1960 to 1985, he worked as a professor at the Collège de France.

Awards and honors
Abragam won the Fernand Holweck Medal and Prize in 1958.
Abragam was elected a Foreign Honorary Member of the American Academy of Arts and Sciences in 1974.
He was awarded the Lorentz Medal in 1982.
He was elected a Foreign Member of the Royal Society (ForMemRS) in 1983.

Publications 

Abragam A & Bleaney B. Electron paramagnetic resonance of transition ions. Oxford, England: Oxford University Press, 1970.

References

External links 
 Anatole Abragam. 15 December 1914 — 8 June 2011 Biographial Memoirs of Fellows of the Royal Society

1914 births
2011 deaths
Scientists from Daugavpils
People from Courland Governorate
20th-century Latvian Jews
Latvian emigrants to France
French physicists
Jewish scientists
Foreign Members of the Royal Society
Foreign Members of the Russian Academy of Sciences
Alumni of Jesus College, Oxford
Members of the French Academy of Sciences
Foreign associates of the National Academy of Sciences
Academic staff of the Collège de France
University of Paris alumni
Fellows of the American Academy of Arts and Sciences
French Army personnel of World War II
Recipients of the Lomonosov Gold Medal
Lorentz Medal winners
Jewish physicists
Members of the Pontifical Academy of Sciences
Recipients of the Matteucci Medal